The Charles River Speedway was a former bicycle and harness racing track located in Allston, Massachusetts, which has been redeveloped into an upscale market.

History
The speedway itself was constructed in 1899 along the Charles River. It began around Market and Arsenal Street and extended all the way to the Harvard Stadium. It was designed by a firm co-founded by Frederick Law Olmsted.

One of the functions of the speedway was to move the racing of horses and other pleasurable activities off of Brighton Road (now Commonwealth Avenue) west of Kenmore Square and Beacon Street in Brookline. As traffic on the roads increased, it became necessary to build the speedway.

At some point, the track was shortened to an oval around where the center of the original track now stands and use ended in the 1960s.

One of the bigger events at the speedway occurred on October 13, 1930 when a new course speed record was set. After seven hours of competition, which was viewed by thousands of spectators, a time of 2:05.5 was set for the  race. The horse team was driven by a Mr. Grattan, the pacer of Mrs. Charles F. Adams.

Only the superintendent's building (Charles River Reservation (Speedway)-Upper Basin Headquarters) is left. It was listed on the National Register of Historic Places. The building itself was even listed on the National Register of Historic Places featured properties and districts list on July 30, 2010. Additionally, it was listed on July 19 of that year. At some point, and by 1941, the building itself was turned into a police substation for the Boston Police Department.

In 2021, the site was redeveloped as an upscale marketplace and community gathering spot, including a microbrewery.

References

External links
M.D.C. Police Photos: A Visual History Of The Metro Police - 8 Speedway photos

Brighton, Boston
Event venues established in 1899
Defunct horse racing venues in Massachusetts
Defunct sports venues in Boston
Harness racing venues in the United States
Charles River
1899 establishments in Massachusetts
Sports venues on the National Register of Historic Places in Massachusetts